The individual dressage in equestrian at the 1936 Olympic Games in Berlin was held on the May Field from 12 to 13 August. German riders took the top two places, with Heinz Pollay winning the gold medal and Friedrich Gerhard the silver. The bronze was won by Alois Podhajsky of Austria.

Competition format
The team and individual dressage competitions used the same results. A test was to be carried out from memory by each rider within 17 minutes, losing half a point for every second over the time limit. There were 40 individual movements in the test. For each movement, each judge gave a score from 0 to 10; this score was multiplied by the movement's coefficient. Each judge's score was used in a point-for-place system (that is, for each judge, the top-scoring pair received 1 point, the second-scoring pair received 2 points, and so on). The points from each of the five judges were summed to give a total number of points for each pair; the lowest number of points won. (The point-for-place system was used only for the individual event; the team event used raw scores.)

Judges were:
 Col. Baron Cl. v. Cederström, Sweden
 Gen. A. Decarpentry, France
 Lt. Col. Baron A. v. Henikstein, Austria
 Gen. v. Poseck, Germany
 Col. Qu. v. Ufford, Netherlands

Results

References

Equestrian at the Summer Olympics